Illingworth and Mixenden are villages in the metropolitan borough of Calderdale, West Yorkshire, England, and together with the surrounding area form the ward of Illingworth and Mixenden.  The ward contains 26 listed buildings that are recorded in the National Heritage List for England.  Of these, four are at Grade II*, the middle of the three grades, and the others are at Grade II, the lowest grade. Apart from the villages of Illingworth and Mixenden and smaller settlements, the ward is rural.  Most of the listed buildings are houses and associated structures, cottages, farmhouses and farm buildings.  The other listed buildings include a chapel and associated structures, a village lock-up and a set of stocks, almshouses, and a former pottery.


Key

Buildings

References

Citations

Sources

Lists of listed buildings in West Yorkshire